Phil Henson (born 30 March 1953) is an English footballer, who played as a midfielder in the Football League for Manchester City, Swansea City, Sheffield Wednesday, Stockport County and Rotherham United.
Henson made his league debut for Manchester City on 27th April 1974 against Manchester United at Old Trafford, a match remembered for Dennis Law's back heel winner which effectively ended the Trafford club's hopes of avoiding relegation to the second division.

He later managed Rotherham from 1991 to 1994.

References

Manchester City F.C. players
Sheffield United F.C. non-playing staff
Living people
Swansea City A.F.C. players
Sheffield Wednesday F.C. players
Sparta Rotterdam players
English Football League players
Association football midfielders
1953 births
Footballers from Manchester
English footballers
English expatriate footballers
Expatriate footballers in the Netherlands
Stockport County F.C. players
Rotherham United F.C. players
English football managers
Rotherham United F.C. managers
English Football League managers